Burgundy is a historical territory and former administrative region and province of east-central France. The province was once home to the Dukes of Burgundy from the early 11th until the late 15th century. The capital of Dijon was one of the great European centres of art and science, a place of tremendous wealth and power, and Western Monasticism. In early Modern Europe, Burgundy was a focal point of courtly culture that set the fashion for European royal houses and their court. The Duchy of Burgundy was a key in the transformation of the Middle Ages toward early modern Europe.

Upon the 9th-century partitions of the Kingdom of Burgundy, the lands and remnants partitioned to the Kingdom of France were reduced to a ducal rank by King Robert II of France in 1004. The House of Burgundy, a cadet branch of the House of Capet, ruled over a territory that roughly conformed to the borders and territories of the modern administrative region of Burgundy. Upon the extinction of the Burgundian male line the duchy reverted to the King of France and the House of Valois. Following the marriage of Philip of Valois and Margaret III of Flanders, the Duchy of Burgundy was absorbed into the Burgundian State alongside parts of the Low Countries which would become collectively known as the Burgundian Netherlands. Upon further acquisitions of the County of Burgundy, Holland, and Luxembourg, the House of Valois-Burgundy came into possession of numerous French and imperial fiefs stretching from the western Alps to the North Sea, in some ways reminiscent of the Middle Frankish realm of Lotharingia.

The Burgundian State, in its own right, was one of the largest ducal territories that existed at the time of the emergence of Early Modern Europe. It was regarded as one of the major powers of the 15th century and the early 16th century. The Dukes of Burgundy were among the wealthiest and the most powerful princes in Europe and were sometimes called "Grand Dukes of the West". Through its possessions the Burgundian State was a major European centre of trade and commerce.

The extinction of the dynasty led to the absorption of the duchy itself into the French crown lands by King Louis XI, while the bulk of the Burgundian possessions in the Low Countries passed to Duke Charles the Bold's daughter, Mary, and her Habsburg descendants. Thus the partition of the Burgundian heritage marked the beginning of the centuries-long French–Habsburg rivalry and played a pivotal role in European politics long after Burgundy had lost its role as an independent political identity.

Etymology 
It is named for the Burgundians, an East Germanic people who moved westwards beyond the Rhine during the late Roman period. The name Burgundy has historically denoted numerous political entities. It first emerged in the 9th century as one of the successors of the ancient Kingdom of the Burgundians, which after its conquest in 532 had formed a constituent part of the Frankish Empire.

Since the inception of the French departmental system in 1790, Burgundy has referred to the geographic area comprising the four departments of Côte-d'Or, Saône-et-Loire, Yonne, and Nièvre.

History

The first recorded inhabitants of the area, that was to become Burgundy, were various tribes of Gallic Celts; the most prominent of which were the semi-republican Aedui, who were eventually incorporated into the Roman Empire following the Gaulish defeat in the Battle of Alesia. Gallo-Roman culture flourished during the Roman period.

During the 4th century, the Burgundians, a Germanic people who may have originated on the Baltic island of Bornholm, settled in the western Alps. They founded the Kingdom of the Burgundians, which was conquered in the 6th century by another Germanic tribe, the Franks.

Under Frankish dominion, the Kingdom of Burgundy continued for several centuries.

Later, the region was divided between the Duchy of Burgundy (to the west) and the Free County of Burgundy (to the east). The Duchy of Burgundy is the better-known of the two, later becoming the French province of Burgundy, while the County of Burgundy became the French province of Franche-Comté.

Burgundy's modern existence is rooted in the dissolution of the Frankish Empire. In the 880s, there were four Burgundies: the duchy, the county, and the kingdoms of Upper Burgundy and Lower Burgundy.

During the Middle Ages, Burgundy was home to some of the most important Western churches and monasteries, including those of Cluny, Cîteaux, and Vézelay. Cluny, founded in 910, exerted a strong influence in Europe for centuries. The first Cistercian abbey was founded in 1098 in Cîteaux. Over the next century, hundreds of Cistercian abbeys were founded throughout Europe, in a large part due to the charisma and influence of Bernard of Clairvaux. The Abbey of Fontenay, a UNESCO World Heritage Site, is today the best-preserved Cistercian abbey in Burgundy. The Abbey of Vézelay, also a UNESCO World Heritage Site, is still a starting point for pilgrimages to Santiago de Compostela. Cluny was almost totally destroyed during the French Revolution.

During the Hundred Years' War, King John II of France gave the duchy to his youngest son, Philip the Bold. The duchy soon became a major rival to the crown. The court in Dijon outshone the French court both economically and culturally. Phillip the Bold's grandson Philip the Good acquired Namur, Hainaut, Brabant, and Holland in modern Belgium and the Netherlands. In 1477, at the battle of Nancy during the Burgundian Wars, the last duke Charles the Bold was killed in battle, and the Duchy itself was annexed by France and became a province. However, the northern part of the empire was taken by the Austrian Habsburgs.

With the French Revolution in the end of the 18th century, the administrative units of the provinces disappeared, but were reconstituted as regions during the Fifth Republic in the 1970s. The modern-day administrative region comprises most of the former duchy.

In 2016, Burgundy and the historical region of Franche-Comté merged for administrative purposes into the new region of Bourgogne-Franche-Comté.

Geography 

The region of Burgundy is both larger than the old Duchy of Burgundy and smaller than the area ruled by the Dukes of Burgundy, from the modern Netherlands to the border of Auvergne. Today, Burgundy is made up of the old provinces:

 Burgundy: Côte-d'Or, Saône-et-Loire, and southern half of Yonne. This corresponds to the old duchy of Burgundy (later called province of Burgundy). However, the old county of Burgundy (later called province of Franche-Comté) is not included inside the Burgundy region, but it makes up the Franche-Comté region. Also, a small part of the duchy of Burgundy (province of Burgundy) is now inside the Champagne-Ardenne region.
 Nivernais: now the department of Nièvre.
 the northern half of Yonne is a territory that was not part of Burgundy (at least not since the 11th century), and was a frontier between Champagne, Île-de-France, and Orléanais, being part of each of these provinces at different times in history.

Major communities 

 Autun
 Auxerre
 Avallon
 Beaune
 Chalon-sur-Saône
 Dijon 
 Le Creusot
 Mâcon
 Montceau-les-Mines
 Nevers
 Paray-le-Monial
 Sens

Climate 
The climate of this region is essentially oceanic (Cfb in Köppen classification), with a continental influence (sometimes called a "half-continental climate").

Politics 
The regional council of Burgundy was the legislative assembly of the region, until its merger to form the regional council of Bourgogne-Franche-Comté.

Culture 

 

Burgundy is one of France's main wine-producing areas. It is well known for both its red and white wines, mostly made from Pinot noir and Chardonnay grapes, respectively, although other grape varieties can be found, including Gamay, Aligote, Pinot blanc, and Sauvignon blanc. The region is divided into the Côte-d'Or, where the most expensive and prized Burgundies are found, and Beaujolais, Chablis, the Côte Chalonnaise and Mâcon. The reputation and quality of the top wines, together with the fact that they are often produced in small quantities, has led to high demand and high prices, with some Burgundies ranking among the most expensive wines in the world.

With regard to cuisine, the region is famous for Dijon mustard, Charolais beef, Bresse chicken, the Burgundian dishes coq au vin and beef bourguignon, and époisses cheese.

Tourist sites of Burgundy include the Rock of Solutré, the Hospices de Beaune, the Ducal Palace in Dijon, and many Renaissance and mediaeval châteaus, castles, churches and abbeys.

Earlier, the southeastern part of Burgundy was heavily industrial, with coal mines near Montceau-les-Mines and iron foundries and crystal works in Le Creusot. These industries declined in the second half of the twentieth century.

The local dialect is known as Burgundian (Bourguignon); it is an Oïl language similar to Standard French but with some Franco-Provençal and Dutch influence.

References

Further reading 

 
 
 
 
 
 
  History, People and Places series.
 
 
  revised and expanded by Francis Pagan, 1990 & 1996.

External links 
 
 
 
  Burgundy : history in the open air—Official French website
  Burgundy statistics on INSEE website
  Regional Council website
  Short guide to Burgundy with main tourist attractions
  
 
 

 
Former regions of France
NUTS 2 statistical regions of the European Union